Grassy Lake Preserve is  of preserve purchased by the State of Florida in 2003 for $2.1 million to protect eight rare species of plants and one rare species of animal. It is located at U.S. 27 and Mountain Lake Cut-Off Road in Lake Wales, Florida)  The property is managed by the Florida Fish and Wildlife Conservation Commission as part of a network of preserves along the Lake Wales Ridge.

The property is officially known as Mountain Lake Cut-Off.

The preserve is located behind Janie Howard Wilson Elementary School.

References

 

Nature reserves in Florida
Protected areas of Polk County, Florida
2003 establishments in Florida
Protected areas established in 2003